Eleanor Feingold is an American statistical geneticist. She is a professor of human genetics and of biostatistics, and executive associate dean, in the University of Pittsburgh Graduate School of Public Health.

Feingold's research results include the discovery that the human genome includes at least 49 different genes that contribute to the shape of the earlobe.

Education and career
Feingold graduated from the Massachusetts Institute of Technology in 1985, with an interdisciplinary bachelor's degree that combined mathematics, public policy, and English. She completed a Ph.D. in statistics at Stanford University in 1993. Her dissertation, Modeling a New Genetic Mapping Method, was supervised by David Siegmund.

After her bachelor's degree, and continuing part-time into her graduate studies, she worked as a mathematician and statistician for the Pacific Gas and Electric Company. After completing her doctorate she became an assistant professor of biostatistics at Emory University. She moved to the University of Pittsburgh in 1997, became a full professor and associate dean there in 2010, and was named executive associate dean in 2015.

Recognition
In 2010 Feingold was named a Fellow of the American Statistical Association.

References

External links
Home page

Year of birth missing (living people)
Living people
American geneticists
American women statisticians
American women geneticists
Statistical geneticists
Massachusetts Institute of Technology alumni
Stanford University alumni
Emory University faculty
University of Pittsburgh faculty
Fellows of the American Statistical Association
21st-century American women